The Hague–Visby Rules is a set of international rules for the international carriage of goods by sea. They are a slightly updated version of the original Hague Rules which were drafted in Brussels in 1924.

The premise of the Hague–Visby Rules (and of the earlier English common law from which the Rules are drawn) was that a carrier typically has far greater bargaining power than the shipper, and that to protect the interests of the shipper/cargo-owner, the law should impose some minimum affreightment obligations upon the carrier.  However, the Hague and Hague–Visby Rules were hardly a charter of new protections for cargo-owners; the English common law prior to 1924 provided more protection for cargo-owners, and imposed more liabilities upon "common carriers".

The official title of the Hague Rules the "International Convention for the Unification of Certain Rules of Law relating to Bills of Lading". After being amended by the Brussels Amendments (officially the "Protocol to Amend the International Convention for the Unification of Certain Rules of Law Relating to Bills of Lading") in 1968, the Rules became known colloquially as the Hague–Visby Rules.

A final amendment was made in the SDR Protocol in 1979. Many countries declined to adopt the Hague–Visby Rules and stayed with the 1924 Hague Rules.  Some other countries which upgraded to Hague-Visby subsequently failed to adopt the 1979 SDR protocol.

Implementing legislation
The Hague–Visby Rules were incorporated into English law by the Carriage of Goods by Sea Act 1971; and English lawyers should note the provisions of the statute as well as the text of the rules. For instance, although Article I(c) of the Rules exempts live animals and deck cargo, section 1(7) restores those items into the category of "goods". Also, although Article III(4) declares a bill of lading to be a mere "prima facie evidence of the receipt by the carrier of the goods", the Carriage of Goods by Sea Act 1992 section 4 upgrades a bill of lading to be "conclusive evidence of receipt".

Under Article X, the Rules apply if ("a) the bill of lading is issued in a contracting State, or (b) the carriage is from a port in a contracting State, or (c) the contract (of carriage) provides that(the) Rules ... are to govern the contract". If the Rules apply, the entire text of Rules is incorporated into the contract of carriage, and any attempt to exclude the Rules is void under Article III (8).

Carriers' duties
Under the Rules, the carrier's main duties are to "properly and carefully load, handle, stow, carry, keep, care for, and discharge the goods carried" and to "exercise due diligence to ... make the ship seaworthy" and to "... properly man, equip and supply the ship". It is implicit (from the common law) that the carrier must not deviate from the agreed route nor from the usual route; but Article IV(4) provides that "any deviation in saving or attempting to save life or property at sea or any reasonable deviation shall not be deemed to be an infringement or breach of these Rules".

The carrier's duties are not "strict", but require only a reasonable standard of professionalism and care; and Article IV allows the carrier a wide range of situations exempting them from liability on a cargo claim. These exemptions include destruction or damage to the cargo caused by: fire, perils of the sea, Act of God, and act of war.  A controversial provision exempts the carrier from liability for "neglect or default of the master ... in the navigation or in the management of the ship".  This provision is considered unfair to the shipper; and both the later Hamburg Rules (which require contracting states to denounce the Hague–Visby Rules) and Rotterdam Rules (which are not yet in force) refuse exemption for negligent navigation and management.

Also, whereas the Hague–Visby Rules require a ship to be seaworthy only "before and at the beginning" of the voyage, under the Rotterdam Rules the carrier will have to keep the ship seaworthy throughout the voyage (although this new duty will be to a reasonable standard that is subject to the circumstances of being at sea).

Shipper's duties
By contrast, the shipper has fewer obligations (mostly implicit), namely: (i) to pay freight; (ii) to pack the goods sufficiently for the journey;  (iii) to describe the goods honestly and accurately; (iv) not to ship dangerous cargoes (unless agreed by both parties);   and (v) to have the goods ready for shipment as agreed; (q.v."notice of readiness to load").  None of these shippers' obligations are enforceable under the Rules; instead they would give rise to a normal action in contract.

Criticism
With only 10 articles, the rules have the virtue of brevity, but they have several faults. When, after 44 years of experience, the 1924 rules were updated with a single minor amendment, they still covered only carriage wholly by sea (thereby ignoring multi-modal transport), and they barely acknowledged the container revolution of the 1950s.  Also, UNCTAD felt that they had actually diluted the protection to shippers once provided by English common law, and proposed instead the more modern Hamburg Rules of 1978, which were embraced by many developing countries, but largely ignored by ship-operating nations. The modern Rotterdam Rules, with some 96 articles, have far more scope and cover multi-modal transport but remain far from general implementation.

Ratifications
A list of ratifications and denouncements of the three conventions is shown below:

See also
 Seaworthiness (law)
 Carriage of Goods by Sea Act 1971
 Carriage of Goods by Sea Act 1992

References

External links
Full text of the 1924 convention, 1968  and 1979 protocols.
Signatures and ratifications of the original convention, as well as the 1968 and 1979 protocols (in French).
Admiralty Law Guide has a brief discussion with useful links

Admiralty law treaties
International trade law
Treaties concluded in 1924
Treaties concluded in 1968
Treaties concluded in 1979
Treaties entered into force in 1931
Treaties entered into force in 1977
Treaties entered into force in 1984
Treaties of Algeria
Treaties of the People's Republic of Angola
Treaties of Antigua and Barbuda
Treaties of Argentina
Treaties of Australia
Treaties of the Bahamas
Treaties of Barbados
Treaties of Belgium
Treaties of Belize
Treaties of Bolivia
Treaties of Cameroon
Treaties of Cape Verde
Treaties extended to British Hong Kong
Treaties extended to Portuguese Macau
Treaties of the Republic of the Congo (Léopoldville)
Treaties of Croatia
Treaties of Ivory Coast
Treaties of Cuba
Treaties of Cyprus
Treaties of Denmark
Treaties of Dominica
Treaties of the Kingdom of Egypt
Treaties of Ecuador
Treaties of Fiji
Treaties of Finland
Treaties of the French Third Republic
Treaties of Nazi Germany
Treaties of East Germany
Treaties of Georgia (country)
Treaties of Greece
Treaties of Grenada
Treaties of Guinea-Bissau
Treaties of Guyana
Treaties of the Kingdom of Hungary (1920–1946)
Treaties of Pahlavi Iran
Treaties of Ireland
Treaties of Israel
Treaties of Italy
Treaties of Jamaica
Treaties of Japan
Treaties of Kenya
Treaties of Kiribati
Treaties of Kuwait
Treaties of Latvia
Treaties of Lithuania
Treaties of Luxembourg
Treaties of Madagascar
Treaties of Malaysia
Treaties of Mauritius
Treaties of Mexico
Treaties of Monaco
Treaties of the People's Republic of Mozambique
Treaties of Nauru
Treaties of the Netherlands
Treaties of New Zealand
Treaties of Nigeria
Treaties of Norway
Treaties of Papua New Guinea
Treaties of Peru
Treaties of the Second Polish Republic
Treaties of the Ditadura Nacional
Treaties of Russia
Treaties of Saint Kitts and Nevis
Treaties of Saint Lucia
Treaties of Saint Vincent and the Grenadines
Treaties of São Tomé and Príncipe
Treaties of Senegal
Treaties of Seychelles
Treaties of Sierra Leone
Treaties of Singapore
Treaties of Slovenia
Treaties of the Solomon Islands
Treaties of Spain
Treaties of the Dominion of Ceylon
Treaties of Sweden
Treaties of Switzerland
Treaties of Syria
Treaties of East Timor
Treaties of Tonga
Treaties of Trinidad and Tobago
Treaties of Turkey
Treaties of Tuvalu
Treaties of the United Kingdom
Treaties of the United States
Treaties of Yugoslavia
Treaties extended to the Faroe Islands
Treaties extended to Greenland
Treaties extended to Bermuda
Treaties extended to the British Antarctic Territory
Treaties extended to the British Virgin Islands
Treaties extended to the Cayman Islands
Treaties extended to the Falkland Islands
Treaties extended to Gibraltar
Treaties extended to the Isle of Man
Treaties extended to Montserrat
Treaties extended to the Turks and Caicos Islands
Treaties extended to the British Windward Islands
Treaties extended to the British Leeward Islands
Treaties extended to the Colony of Barbados
Treaties extended to the Colony of North Borneo
Treaties extended to British Somaliland
Treaties extended to British Cyprus
Treaties extended to British Dominica
Treaties extended to the Colony of Fiji
Treaties extended to the Gambia Colony and Protectorate
Treaties extended to the Gold Coast (British colony)
Treaties extended to British Guiana
Treaties extended to the Colony of Jamaica
Treaties extended to British Kenya
Treaties extended to the Gilbert and Ellice Islands
Treaties extended to the Federated Malay States
Treaties extended to British Mauritius
Treaties extended to the Colony and Protectorate of Nigeria
Treaties extended to Mandatory Palestine
Treaties extended to Saint Helena, Ascension and Tristan da Cunha
Treaties extended to the Colony of Sarawak
Treaties extended to the Crown Colony of Seychelles
Treaties extended to the Colony of Sierra Leone
Treaties extended to the British Solomon Islands
Treaties extended to British Ceylon
Treaties extended to the Straits Settlements
Treaties extended to Tanganyika (territory)
Treaties extended to the Kingdom of Tonga (1900–1970)
Treaties extended to the Crown Colony of Trinidad and Tobago
Treaties extended to the Sultanate of Zanzibar
Treaties extended to Portuguese Angola
Treaties extended to Portuguese Cape Verde
Treaties extended to Portuguese Mozambique
Treaties extended to Portuguese Timor
Treaties extended to Portuguese Guinea
Treaties extended to the Colony of the Bahamas
Treaties extended to Ashmore and Cartier Islands
Treaties extended to the Australian Antarctic Territory
Treaties extended to Christmas Island
Treaties extended to the Cocos (Keeling) Islands
Treaties extended to the Coral Sea Islands
Treaties extended to Heard Island and McDonald Islands
Treaties extended to the Nauru Trust Territory
Treaties extended to Norfolk Island
Treaties extended to the Territory of New Guinea
Treaties extended to the Territory of Papua
Treaties extended to the Belgian Congo
Treaties extended to Ruanda-Urundi
Treaties extended to Curaçao and Dependencies
Treaties extended to Surinam (Dutch colony)
Treaties extended to Italian Somaliland
Treaties extended to the Cook Islands
Treaties extended to Niue
Treaties extended to Tokelau
Treaties extended to French Algeria
Treaties extended to Clipperton Island
Treaties extended to French Comoros
Treaties extended to French Somaliland
Treaties extended to French Guiana
Treaties extended to French Polynesia
Treaties extended to the French Southern and Antarctic Lands
Treaties extended to Guadeloupe
Treaties extended to Martinique
Treaties extended to Mayotte
Treaties extended to New Caledonia
Treaties extended to Réunion
Treaties extended to Saint Pierre and Miquelon
Treaties extended to Wallis and Futuna
Treaties extended to the Aden Protectorate
Treaties extended to Guernsey
Treaties extended to Jersey
Treaties extended to the Emirate of Transjordan
Treaties extended to Basutoland
Treaties extended to Nyasaland
Treaties extended to the Crown Colony of Malta
Treaties extended to British Burma
Treaties extended to the Dominion of Newfoundland
Treaties extended to the Colony of Aden
Treaties extended to the New Hebrides
Treaties extended to Swaziland (protectorate)
Treaties extended to the Uganda Protectorate
Treaties extended to Southern Rhodesia
Treaties extended to Northern Rhodesia
Treaties extended to Brunei (protectorate)
Treaties extended to British Honduras